This is a list of longest naval ships.

List

Ships may differ within the class. Measures are taken from the largest ship of the class.

References

Lists of ships
Longest ship
Ships, naval